Maharashtra Rashtravadi Congress (Maharashtra Nationalist Congress) is a minor splinter group of the Nationalist Congress Party in the Indian state of Maharashtra.

Political parties in Maharashtra
Political schisms
Nationalist Congress Party
Political parties with year of establishment missing